The following is a list of Major League Baseball players, retired or active. As of the end of the 2011 season, there have been 998 players with a last name that begins with W who have been on a major league roster at some point.

W

For reasons of space, this list has been split into two pages:
 Paul Wachtel through Possum Whitted
 Kevin Wickander through Biff Wysong

External links
Last Names starting with W - Baseball-Reference.com

 W